The Germama (or Kesem or Kessem) River, is a tributary of the Awash River in Ethiopia. The name Germama comes from the Amharic word which means "frolicking", "boisterous", or "frisky".

The Germama is not a navigable stream, and flows with a great volume during the rainy season. It rises west of Kese Koremash, flowing east to the Awash, its course delineating a few kilometers of the northern boundary of the Awash National Park. The Kessem River passes an altitude drop from more than 2000 m on a flow length of ca.130 km. The steep gadient of the river profile is the reason for its turbulent flow regime, which is also reflected in its name. The lowlands of the upper Germama was the location of the former Shewan district of Bulga; the lower course defines the northern boundary of the Shewan district of Menjar.

The Ethiopian Ministry of Water Resources began construction of a dam on the Germama in 2005, which would help irrigate areas along both sides of the river, and in the Dofen and Kebena Mountains. In December 2008, a spokesman for the Ministry announced that the project was 98% complete.

Notes 

Rivers of Ethiopia
Awash River